Sir William Hannah McLean KBE (1877–1967) was a British civil servant in the Colonial Office.

McLean was the first urban planner, responsible for the layout of  Khartoum, Alexandria, where he was city engineer and of Jerusalem, where he prepared the master plan, in 1918.

He divided Jerusalem into four zones:

(1) the Old City, in which a ‘‘medieval aspect’’ was to be preserved through the prohibition of all new construction;

(2) a zone of non-construction around the Old City, where undesirable buildings would be cleared and the area left to its natural state; (3) an area to the north and east of the Old City, where buildings could be erected only with special approval; and

(4) an area to the north and west of the Old City that was set aside for modern development.

He was a Scottish Unionist Party member of the House of Commons of the United Kingdom for Glasgow Tradeston between the general elections of 1931 and 1935.

In 1938, he was appointed Commander of the Venerable Order of the Hospital of St. John of Jerusalem.

References

External links 
 

1877 births
1967 deaths
Unionist Party (Scotland) MPs
Members of the Parliament of the United Kingdom for Scottish constituencies
UK MPs 1931–1935
Knights Commander of the Order of the British Empire
Civil servants in the Colonial Office